(née Harada) is a Japanese former fencer. She competed in the women's individual épée events at the 2004 and 2008 Summer Olympics.

References

External links
 

1979 births
Living people
Japanese female épée fencers
Olympic fencers of Japan
Fencers at the 2004 Summer Olympics
Fencers at the 2008 Summer Olympics
People from Yamagata Prefecture
Asian Games medalists in fencing
Fencers at the 2010 Asian Games
Asian Games gold medalists for Japan
Medalists at the 2010 Asian Games
20th-century Japanese women
21st-century Japanese women